Hugh Phillips may refer to:

 Hugh Phillips (surgeon) (1940–2005), British surgeon
 Hugh Phillips (referee) (1921–1996), Scottish football referee
 Hugh Phillips (cricketer) (born 1929), English cricketer
 Hugh Phillips Engineering, Wales manufacturer of steam locomotive valves and controls

Phillips, Hugh